The Martha Brae River is a river of Jamaica.  It is located in Trelawny on the north coast of Jamaica, towards the western edge, about 6 miles south of Falmouth which is in Trelawny Jamaica.  The river features rafting.         

A small village west of the river is named Martha's Brae because of this nearby river.  Northwest of the village is Gun Hill, where judge John Bradshaw was reportedly re-buried by his son James Bradshaw, to prevent desecration of his father's remains by King Charles II of England.

See also
List of rivers of Jamaica

References
 GEOnet Names Server
OMC Map
CIA Map
Ford, Jos C. and Finlay, A.A.C. (1908).The Handbook of Jamaica. Jamaica Government Printing Office

Rivers of Jamaica

It is used for irragtion, rafting and water supplies.
The rivers name is a corrupted version of Rio Mateberino. The story goes a Taino witch was tortured by Spanish settlers into revealing the location of a gold stash hidden along the river. After divulging, she changed the course of the water, killing the Spanish and blocking the cave where the treasure remains hidden.